Mud crab may refer to any crab that lives in or near mud, such as:

Scylla serrata
Scylla tranquebarica
Scylla paramamosain
Scylla olivacea
Members of the family Panopeidae, such as Panopeus herbstii
Members of the family Xanthidae
Helice crassa, the tunnelling mud crab

Crabs
ja:ノコギリガザミ